Blocked call may refer to:
 Caller ID blocking
 Call blocking
 Blocking probability